Fomento is a town and municipality in the Sancti Spíritus Province of Cuba. It was founded in 1864.

Geography
The municipality is divided into the barrios of Fomento (municipal seat) and the village of Jíquimas. Until 1976 the villages of Juan Bravo and Güinía de Miranda were part of Fomento, when they passed in the new province of Villa Clara, as part of the municipality of Manicaragua.

Demographics
In 2004, the municipality of Fomento had a population of 33,528.

Personalities
MLB All-Star Kendrys Morales was born in Fomento but spent the majority of his formative years in Havana.

See also
Municipalities of Cuba
List of cities in Cuba

References

External links
 Fomentografia, Web of fomentense Photographer

Populated places in Sancti Spíritus Province